The 2011 FIVB Women's World Cup was played from 4 to 18 November 2011 in Japan. The tournament was the first step in the qualification process for the 2012 Summer Olympics in London, United Kingdom. The top three teams qualified for the Olympics, and joined Great Britain as they had already secured a berth as the host country.

Qualification
12 teams participated in the World Cup:

 The host nation's team. 
 The five champions of their respective continental championships in 2011. 
 Four highest-ranked second-place teams of their respective continental championships in 2011 (according to the FIVB World Ranking as of January 15, 2011). 
 Two wild cards chosen from among the participants of the continental championships in 2011.

FIVB World Ranking for second-place teams (as of January 15, 2011)

Squads

Venues

Format
The competition system of the 2011 World Cup for Women is the single Round-Robin system. Each team played once against each of the 11 remaining teams. Points were accumulated during the whole tournament, and the final ranking was determined by the total points gained.

The teams were divided into 2 groups of 6 teams each. 
Rounds 1 + 2 (30 matches, 5 days): Teams played against teams in the same group 
Rounds 3 + 4 (36 matches, 6 days): Teams played against teams in the other group

Pool standing procedure
1. Match points 
2. Numbers of matches won 
3. Sets ratio 
4. Points ratio

Match won 3–0 or 3–1: 3 match points for the winner, 0 match points for the loser 
Match won 3–2: 2 match points for the winner, 1 match point for the loser

Results

|}

First round

Site A

|}

Site B

|}

Second round

Site A

|}

Site B

|}

Third round

Site A

|}

Site B

|}

Fourth round

Site A

|}

Site B

|}

Final standing

Awards

 Most Valuable Player
  Carolina Costagrande
 Best Scorer  Bethania de la Cruz
 Best Spiker  Destinee Hooker
 Best Blocker  Christiane Furst
 Best Server  Bethania de la Cruz

 Best Digger  Yuko Sano
 Best Setter  Yoshie Takeshita
 Best Receiver  Fabiana de Oliveira
 Best Libero'''
  Nam Jie-youn

References

External links
 Official website

2011 Women
World Cup Women
World Cup Women
International volleyball competitions hosted by Japan
November 2011 sports events in Japan
Women's volleyball in Japan